Karchaghbyur is a village in the Vardenis Municipality of the Gegharkunik province of Armenia.

Etymology 
The village was previously known as Gedakbulag.

History 
A walled settlement close to Karchaghbyur which was abandoned in the 1st century BCE, of the Persian or Hellenistic period, is being excavated.

References

External links 

Populated places in Gegharkunik Province
Archaeological sites in Armenia
Former populated places in the Caucasus